Nathan Fellows Dixon III (August 28, 1847November 8, 1897) was a United States representative and Senator from Rhode Island.

Early life
Dixon was born in Westerly, Rhode Island on August 28, 1847. He attended the local schools and Phillips Academy in Andover, Massachusetts. Dixon graduated from Brown University with a AB degree in 1869, studied law with his father, then completed his legal studies at Albany Law School (Albany, New York) in 1871. While at Brown, Dixon became a member of the Theta Delta Chi fraternity.

Legal and business career 
Dixon was admitted to the bar in 1871, commenced practice in Westerly, and grew his legal business to include Rhode Island, Connecticut, and New York. As a partner in the firm of Dixon & Perrin, Dixon became a noted corporate attorney and his clients included the New York, Providence and Boston Railroad. From 1877 to 1885 he was United States Attorney for the District of Rhode Island.

Dixon was also active in several businesses, including serving as president of the Dixon Granite Works and the Washington National Bank of Westerly. In addition, he served on the board of directors of several corporations, including the Pawcatuck Valley Railway and Providence & Stonington Steamship Company. Dixon also participated in Freemasonry, and was a member of the lodge in Westerly, as well Stonington's Palmer Chapter of the Royal Arch Masons and Westerly's commandery of the Knights Templar.

Political career 
Dixon was elected as a Republican to the Forty-eighth Congress to fill the vacancy caused by the resignation of Jonathan Chace and served from February 12 to March 3, 1885; he was not a candidate for re-nomination. Dixon was a member of the Rhode Island Senate from 1886 to 1889. He was elected to the U.S. Senate to fill the vacancy caused by the resignation of Jonathan Chace and served from April 10, 1889, to March 3, 1895; he was not a candidate for reelection. While in the Senate he was chairman of the Committee on Patents (52nd Congress).

Death and burial
After leaving the Senate, Dixon resumed the practice of law and his business and banking interests, and maintained a farm on which he bred cattle as a hobby. In addition, he was a member of the state Board of Charities and Corrections, and a member of the commission created to revise the state constitution.

Dixon died in Westerly on November 8, 1897. He was buried at River Bend Cemetery in Westerly.

Family 
Nathan Fellows Dixon III was the son of Representative Nathan F. Dixon II and Harriet Palmer Swan Dixon. He was a grandson of Senator Nathan F. Dixon I. In 1873, he married Grace McClure of Albany, New York.They remained married until his death and had no children.

References

External links

1847 births
1897 deaths
United States Attorneys for the District of Rhode Island
Republican Party Rhode Island state senators
Brown University alumni
Dixon family
Albany Law School alumni
People from Westerly, Rhode Island
Republican Party United States senators from Rhode Island
Republican Party members of the United States House of Representatives from Rhode Island
19th-century American politicians